PWG Anniversary Show is an annual professional wrestling event produced by Pro Wrestling Guerrilla (PWG). This event is usually held in July every year to commemorate the anniversary of PWG's debut event on July 26, 2003. There have been only two instances where the event has been held in other months than July. The 2013 edition was held in August while the 2021 edition was held in September.

It is not specifically called the "anniversary show" and has undergone many names. The most common name is Threemendous, which was first used to celebrate the promotion's third anniversary in 2006. PWG has used this name for its anniversary events on a few more occasions.

Dates, venues and main events

Results

The Reason for the Season

2nd Annual PWG Bicentennial Birthday Extravaganza
The match between Aerial Express and Arrogance on night one was awarded the 2005 Southern California Match of the Year Award by SoCal Uncensored.

Threemendous

Giant-Size Annual #4

The match between Danielson and Generico was awarded the 2007 Southern California Match of the Year Award by SoCal Uncensored.

Life During Wartime

Threemendous II - Sixth Anniversary Event

Seven

Eight

Threemendous III

The three-way match between Super Smash Brothers, Future Shock and Young Bucks was awarded the 2012 Southern California Match of the Year Award by SoCal Uncensored.

Ten

The three-way match between Young Bucks, Dojo Bros and Inner City Machine Guns was awarded the 2013 Southern California Match of the Year Award by SoCal Uncensored.

Eleven

Threemendous IV

Thirteen

Pushin Forward Back

Threemendous V

Sixteen

The luchador six-man tag team match pitting Bandido, Flamita and Rey Horus against Black Taurus, Laredo Kid and Puma King was awarded the 2019 Southern California Match of the Year Award by SoCal Uncensored.

Threemendous VI

Nineteen

References

External links
Pro Wrestling Guerrilla official website

Professional wrestling anniversary shows
Professional wrestling in Los Angeles
Recurring events established in 2004
Pro Wrestling Guerrilla events
Professional wrestling in California